The Joseph P. O. Sullivan House is a historic house at 142 S. 17th Avenue in Maywood, Illinois. The house was built circa 1895 by the Proviso Land Association for Joseph P. O. Sullivan. The Proviso Land Association was the second land developer to invest in Maywood, after the Maywood Company; most homes built by the Association have been demolished, making the Sullivan House a rare example of their work. Like many of the Association's homes, the Sullivan House has an American Foursquare design. The house has a rectangular two-story layout with a front porch, a projecting bay on one side, a hip roof, and a dormer with a classical Palladian window.

The house was added to the National Register of Historic Places on May 22, 1992.

References

Houses on the National Register of Historic Places in Cook County, Illinois
American Foursquare architecture in Illinois
Maywood, Illinois